René Fernando Beltrán Peréa (born 19 October 1997) is a Mexican footballer who plays as a forward for Murciélagos.

References

1997 births
Living people
Association football forwards
Murciélagos FC footballers
Ascenso MX players
Liga Premier de México players
Tercera División de México players
People from Zapopan, Jalisco
Footballers from Jalisco
Mexican footballers